The Rhynchines or Rhynchinoi were a South Slavic (Sklavenoi) tribe in the region of southern Macedonia in the 7th century. According to Traian Stoianovich, they were Slavic or Avaro-Slavic, and their name probably derives from a local, unidentified river, likely between the lower Vardar and lower Strymon.

The tribe is attested in the Miracles of Saint Demetrius as having formed a sklavinia near the city of Thessaloniki, under a king named Perboundos in the mid-7th century. They were apparently a powerful tribe. After Perboundos was arrested and executed by Byzantine authorities, the Rhynchines rose up and allied themselves with two other nearby sklaviniai, the Sagudates and the Drugubites, and launched an unsuccessful siege of Thessalonica (in 676–678 AD).

In the 8th and 9th centuries the Rynchinoi, Vlachorynchinoi and Sagudates moved eastwards into Chalkidiki. Porphyrius Uspensky found a 17th-century manuscript at Kastamonitou that mentioned the Richenoi ( or Vlachorichenoi) and Sagudates having come from Bulgaria across Macedonia to Mount Athos, at the time of the Iconoclasm. The name "Vlachorynchinoi" suggests mixing of Vlachs or Romance-speakers and the tribe.

References

Sources 
 

7th century in Europe
Sclaveni
Medieval Macedonia
Slavic tribes in Macedonia